Elbert Watts is a former defensive back in the National Football League.

Biography
Watts was born on March 20, 1963 in Carson, California.

Career
Watts was drafted in the ninth round of the 1986 NFL Draft by the Los Angeles Rams and played that season with the Green Bay Packers. He played at the collegiate level at the University of Southern California and the University of Oklahoma.

See also
List of Green Bay Packers players

References

People from Carson, California
Green Bay Packers players
American football defensive backs
Santa Monica Corsairs football players
Sportspeople from Los Angeles County, California
USC Trojans football players
Oklahoma Sooners football players
Living people
1963 births
Players of American football from California